John Willard Peterson (November 1, 1921 – September 20, 2006) was a songwriter who had a major influence on evangelical Christian music in the 1950s through the 1970s. He wrote over 1000 songs, and 35 cantatas.

Biography
Born in Lindsborg, Kansas, he served as an Army Air Force pilot flying the China Hump during World War II. Later, he attended Moody Bible Institute and served on the radio staff there for a number of years.

In 1953, he graduated from the American Conservatory of Music in Chicago and shortly thereafter settled in Pennsylvania to continue his songwriting career. He then moved to Grand Rapids, Michigan, where for over ten years he was President and Editor-in-Chief of Singspiration, a sacred music publishing company. While there, he compiled and edited the hymnal, Great Hymns of the Faith (1961), which included 47 of his compositions out of a total of 548. He also served on the board of Gospel Films, Inc. of Muskegon, Michigan.

He also had direct contact with popular Christian musicians of the day such as Bill Pearce and Dick Anthony. He resided in Scottsdale, Arizona, where he continued to write music. Peterson died September 20, 2006, aged 84, following a bout with prostate cancer.

Some of his more popular song titles include "It Took a Miracle", "Over the Sunset Mountains", "Heaven Came Down", "So Send I You", "Springs of Living Water", "Jesus is Coming Again", "Surely Goodness and Mercy", "This is the day that the Lord hath made" and "O Glorious Love". His cantatas include Night of Miracles and Down From His Glory. He also composed 
the musical "Jesus is Coming", arranged by Don Wyrtzen.

In 1986, he was inducted into the Gospel Music Hall of Fame.

References

External links
 Official web site
  A tribute page to John W. Peterson, created by Ralph Merrifield, newhopemusic.com

1921 births
2006 deaths
People from Lindsborg, Kansas
Songwriters from Kansas
United States Army Air Forces pilots of World War II
American evangelicals
Christian music songwriters
Musicians from Scottsdale, Arizona
Musicians from Grand Rapids, Michigan
Deaths from prostate cancer
Songwriters from Michigan
Songwriters from Arizona
20th-century American composers
Hymnal editors
Deaths from cancer in the United States